Gendərə (also, Gëndere and Gendara) is a village and municipality in the Yardymli Rayon of Azerbaijan.  Its population is 380.

References 

Populated places in Yardimli District